Svatoslav Galík (31 January 1938 – 27 November 2019) was a competitive orienteer who competed for Czechoslovakia. At the 1970 World Orienteering Championships in Eisenach he won a bronze medal in the relay, together with Zdenek Lenhart, Bohuslav Beranek and Jaroslav Jasek.

After finishing his career and moving to Velké Karlovice, he took up cross-country skiing and cycling. In Velké Karlovice-Léskové he was first the manager of the Svit recreation centre, after 1990 he owned and operated it under the name of Hotel Galik.

References

1938 births
2019 deaths
Czechoslovak orienteers
Male orienteers
Foot orienteers
World Orienteering Championships medalists
Sportspeople from Zlín